John J. "Jack" O'Callahan (born July 24, 1957) is an American former professional ice hockey player who played 390 National Hockey League (NHL) regular season games between 1982 and 1989 for the Chicago Blackhawks and New Jersey Devils. Before turning professional, he was a member of the 1980 Winter Olympics United States national team that upset the Soviet Union in the "Miracle on Ice" game.

Playing career

Amateur career
O'Callahan graduated from Boston Latin School in 1975 and then attended Boston University from 1975–1979, where he was a team captain during the 1977–78 and 1978–79 seasons and was named All-East twice, All-New England and All-America, team MVP twice, Beanpot MVP, NCAA tournament MVP, and Cochrane award winner twice. He also played for Team USA at the 1979 Ice Hockey World Championship tournament in Moscow.

The year after he graduated, O'Callahan was selected to represent the US in the 1980 Winter Olympics. Three days before the Olympics, in an exhibition match against the Soviet Union, O'Callahan injured his left knee. This forced him out of the opening game against Sweden at the Olympics. He returned for the famous "Miracle on Ice" game against the Soviet Union in the first game of the medal round.

Professional career
O'Callahan was drafted 96th overall in the 1977 NHL Entry Draft by the Chicago Blackhawks. He joined the Hawks after the Olympics, initially playing for two seasons in the minors for the American Hockey League New Brunswick Hawks. He finally made the Blackhawks roster in 1982 and played there until 1987 when the Hawks left him unprotected. He was claimed off waivers by the New Jersey Devils and played a further two seasons before retiring 1989. He also made a final appearance for the United States national team at the 1989 Ice Hockey World Championship tournament.

Post career
Jack O'Callahan returned to Chicago after his retirement and went into the financial services business on the Chicago Mercantile Exchange. He later co-founded Beanpot Financial Services with former NHL player Jack Hughes. O'Callahan then worked on behalf of the Blackhawk Alumni Association.

In popular culture
In a 1981 TV movie about the gold medal-winning U.S. hockey team called Miracle on Ice, O'Callahan is played by Peter Horton.

In the 2004 Disney film Miracle, he is played by Michael Mantenuto.  Mantenuto grew up skating and playing hockey from the time he could walk. Several colleges, like Boston University (where O'Callahan and his Miracle on Ice teammates Mike Eruzione, Jim Craig, and Dave Silk once played) attempted to recruit him to play college hockey, but Mantenuto ultimately decided to play, albeit briefly, for the University of Maine. He got the part of Jack O'Callahan after he got into a fight with another actor who was picking on him during tryouts.

Inducted into International Hockey Hall of Fame in 1999

Awards and achievements

Career statistics

Regular season and playoffs

International

References

External links

O'Callahan bio @ hockeydraftcentral.com

1957 births
1980 US Olympic ice hockey team
AHCA Division I men's ice hockey All-Americans
American men's ice hockey defensemen
Boston University Terriers men's ice hockey players
Calgary Cowboys draft picks
Chicago Blackhawks draft picks
Chicago Blackhawks players
Ice hockey people from Boston
Ice hockey players at the 1980 Winter Olympics
Living people
Medalists at the 1980 Winter Olympics
New Brunswick Hawks players
New Jersey Devils players
Olympic gold medalists for the United States in ice hockey
Springfield Indians players
NCAA men's ice hockey national champions